Herbert Charpiot Jones (January 21, 1918 – December 7, 1941) was an officer in the United States Navy who was posthumously awarded the Medal of Honor for his actions during the attack on Pearl Harbor.

Biography
Herbert Jones was born on January 21, 1918, at Los Angeles, California and enlisted in the United States Naval Reserve May 14, 1935. He was commissioned an ensign on November 14, 1940, and reported to the battleship  at Pearl Harbor two weeks later.

On December 7, 1941, the 23-year-old ensign was about to relieve the officer-of-the-deck on California when Japanese planes swooped in to attack. In the first wave, a torpedo and a bomb hit the ship. Jones dove into a smoke-filled hatchway and crawled along oil-slick decks to rescue a stricken sailor before being temporarily overcome by fumes. Reviving, he saw an antiaircraft battery without a leader and, staggering to his feet, took command. As a second wave of Japanese planes came in, the young officer fired his guns until all their ammunition was expended. Since the torpedo had put California's ammunition hoist out of action, Jones quickly organized a party of volunteers to go below and pass the ammunition up by hand. The vitally needed shells had just begun to reach the battery when a bomb hit the ship and mortally wounded him.

Medal of Honor citation
For conspicuous devotion to duty, extraordinary courage, and complete disregard of his own life, above and beyond the call of duty, during the attack on the Fleet in Pearl Harbor, by Japanese forces on 7 December 1941. Ens. Jones organized and led a party, which was supplying ammunition to the antiaircraft battery of the U.S.S. California after the mechanical hoists were put out of action when he was fatally wounded by a bomb explosion. When 2 men attempted to take him from the area which was on fire, he refused to let them do so, saying in words to the effect, "Leave me alone! I am done for. Get out of here before the magazines go off."

Namesake
 was named in his honor. The ship was launched January 19, 1943, by the Consolidated Steel Corporation, Orange, Texas; sponsored by Mrs. Joanne Ruth Jones, his widow; and commissioned on July 21, 1943, Lieutenant Commander Alfred W. Gardes, Jr. in command.

See also

List of Medal of Honor recipients
List of Medal of Honor recipients for World War II

References

1918 births
1941 deaths
People from Los Angeles
United States Navy officers
United States Navy Medal of Honor recipients
United States Navy personnel killed in World War II
Burials at Fort Rosecrans National Cemetery
World War II recipients of the Medal of Honor
Deaths by airstrike during World War II
Deaths by Japanese airstrikes during the attack on Pearl Harbor
Military personnel from California